United or Unified or Unitary Socialist Party may refer to:

 Unified Socialist Party of Andalusia
 United Socialist Party (Bolivia)
 Unified Socialist Party (Burkina Faso)
 Unified Socialist Party of Catalonia
 Unified Socialist Party (France)
 Unified Socialist Party (Germany)
 Unified Socialist Party (Italy)
 Unitary Socialist Party (Italy, 1922)
 Unitary Socialist Party (Italy, 1949)
 United Socialist Party of Korea
 Unified Socialist Party of Mexico
 Unified Socialist Party (Morocco)
 Communist Party of Nepal (Unified Socialist)
 Unified Socialist Party (Persia)
 United Socialist Party (Romania)
 Socialist United Party of Russia
 Unitary Socialist Party–Socialist Agreement, San Marino
 United Socialist Party (Sri Lanka)
 United Socialist Party (UK)
 United Socialist Party of Venezuela
United Socialist Party of Venezuela Youth

See also
 
 
 
 Socialist Party (disambiguation)